Nystad is a small village in the municipality of Fauske in Nordland county, Norway.

References

Fauske
Villages in Nordland